Backspacer was the last studio album by the New Zealand rock band Supergroove. It was released in 1996 by RCA Records. Before recording, creative differences saw vocalist Che Ness and trumpeter Tim Stewart fired from the band. The album is musically very different from their first, being less funk and more straight rock, with a darker and more melancholy feeling in songs like "Dear Mother (Don't Let Me Go)", "This Stupid Grin" and "The Decline and Fall of Us Both."

Supergroove toured the album without Che Ness but due to poor reception and sales of the record and without Che Ness, Supergroove broke up soon after in 1997.

Three singles were released from the album, "Only Ever You", "If I Had My Way" (a top 10 hit) and "5th Wheel".

Track listing 
All tracks written by Joe Lonie and Karl Steven except "Who's Side Are You on Anyway?" and "5th Wheel" by Lonie, Steven, and Ben Sciascia.

Source: Spotify.

References

 [ Backspacer on allmusicguide]
 Amplifier article on Supergroove

1996 albums
Supergroove albums